Raúl Chappell Morales (23 July 1911 in Callao, Peru – May 1977 in the United States) was a Peruvian football player. He is best known for having played in Club Sport Boys of Peru and for the Peru national football team. He was part of Peru's squad at the 1936 Summer Olympics, but he did not play in any matches. He also became a coach after the end of his career as a player.

References

1911 births
1977 deaths
Sportspeople from Callao
Peruvian footballers
Peru international footballers
Olympic footballers of Peru
Footballers at the 1936 Summer Olympics
Peruvian Primera División players
Sport Boys footballers
Peruvian football managers
Association football defenders
Peruvian expatriates in the United States